Runda is an affluent neighbourhood located in the northern part of Nairobi. The name Runda was borrowed from the name of the coffee estate that existed in the area before it became a residential area; it is an abbreviation for Reserved United Nations Development Area. The coffee estate was owned by Runda Estates Ltd. Runda is one of  the suburbs of the city of Nairobi, the capital and largest city in Kenya. It is generally regarded as one of the richest suburbs in Kenya.

Overview
It is bounded by Limuru Road to the west, Ruaka Road to the south, Kiambu Road to the east, and coffee plantations to the north. The area encompasses Closeburn Estate, Mimosa and Old Runda to the west, Mumwe and Whispers to the south, and New Runda and Muringa to the east. Recent developments has seen the greater Runda area expand and now include such developments as Runda Mhasibu and Runda Paradise to the north. It is separated from Nairobi city centre by the 2,500-acre Karura Forest. The landscape in Runda Estate ranges between 1,690 meters above sea level in low lying areas to 1,727 meters above sea level in elevated areas. The area occupied by Runda Estate (estimated to be 14km2) was once a large coffee estate owned by various firms with 3 coffee processing factories.

History
Runda was developed in 1972 by the project due to demand that when United Nations Environment Programme Headquarters was built in Gigiri in the early 1970s. The first phase of the estate (Old Runda) was completed between 1972 and 1980.

References

Further reading
Background information
 
 
 
News and political information
 
 
 

Suburbs of Nairobi
Populated places in Nairobi Province